Elie Munk (1900–1981), was a German-born French rabbi and rabbinic scholar, "a scion of a long and distinguished line of German rabbis and scholars".

A number of other Jewish scholars have similar names. Eliyahu Munk translated numerous Jewish Bible commentaries to English. Eli Munk wrote the book Seven Days of the Beginning. All are members of the same extended family.

Career
From 1926 to 1936, he was district rabbi of Ansbach, Bavaria, Germany.

In 1936, he moved with his family to Paris, where he was rabbi of the Communauté Israélite de la Stricte Observance.

After the Nazi invasion, they moved to Switzerland in 1940, and remained there until Paris was liberated.

Selected publications
Die Welt der Gebete (2 volumes, 1938). In English, The World of Prayer (2 volumes, 1954–63)
Das Licht der Ewigkeit (1935)
La justice sociale en Israel (1947)
Rachel (on the duties of Jewish women, 1951)
a translation into French of Rashi's Pentateuch commentary (1957)

Personal life
He married Fanny Frumet Goldberger (1906–1979). Their children included Amélie Munk, who married Immanuel Jakobovits, who became the UK's Chief Rabbi, and Miriam Munk, who married Rabbi Abba Bronspiegel.

References

External links

1900 births
1981 deaths
20th-century German rabbis
20th-century French rabbis